The 1980 ECAC Hockey Men's Ice Hockey Tournament was the 19th tournament in league history. It was played between March 11 and March 15, 1980. Quarterfinal games were played at home team campus sites, while the 'final four' games were played at the Boston Garden in Boston, Massachusetts. By reaching the championship game both, Cornell and Dartmouth received invitations to participate in the 1980 NCAA Division I Men's Ice Hockey Tournament.

Format
The tournament featured three rounds of play, all of which were single-elimination. The three teams that were division champions automatically qualified for the tournament while the remaining five seeds were given to the teams with the highest winning percentage. The top four seeds were given out to the three division champions and the top qualifier and assorted based upon winning percentage. The remaining four seeds were assigned to the other qualifiers and assorted based upon winning percentage. In the quarterfinals the first seed and eighth seed, the second seed and seventh seed, the third seed and sixth seed and the fourth seed and fifth seed played against one another. In the semifinals, the highest seed plays the lowest remaining seed while the two remaining teams play with the winners advancing to the championship game and the losers advancing to the third place game.

Conference standings
Note: GP = Games played; W = Wins; L = Losses; T = Ties; Pct. = Winning percentage; GF = Goals for; GA = Goals against

Bracket
Teams are reseeded after the first round

Note: * denotes overtime period(s)

Quarterfinals

(1) Boston College vs. (8) Cornell

(2) Providence vs. (7) Colgate

(3) Dartmouth vs. (6) Rensselaer

(4) Vermont vs. (5) Clarkson

Semifinals

(2) Providence vs. (8) Cornell

(3) Dartmouth vs. (5) Clarkson

Third Place

(2) Providence vs. (5) Clarkson

Championship

(3) Dartmouth vs. (8) Cornell

Tournament awards

All-Tournament Team
None

MOP
Darren Eliot (Cornell)

References

External links
ECAC Hockey
1979–80 ECAC Hockey Standings
1979–80 NCAA Standings

ECAC Hockey Men's Ice Hockey Tournament
ECAC tournament